Triangle station can refer to a station located at a wye or triangular junction.

Triangle station may also refer to:

Triangle railway station, a station near Triangle, West Yorkshire, England
Federal Triangle station, a metro station in Washington, D.C., United States
Golden Triangle station, a planned light rail station in Eden Prairie (Minneapolis–Saint Paul area), Minnesota, United States
Winnersh Triangle railway station, a station in Winnersh, Berkshire, England

See also
Trianglen Station, in Copenhagen, Denmark
Triangeln railway station, in Malmö, Sweden
Wye station (disambiguation)